Marek Frimmel (born 10 November 1992) is a Slovak football forward who currently plays for the 2. liga club FC Rohožník.

Career

AS Trenčín
He made his debut for AS Trenčín against Slovan Bratislava on 25 August 2012.

MFK Skalica
On 29 December 2018 it was confirmed, that Frimmel had signed for Skalica.

Career statistics

External links

References

1992 births
Living people
Sportspeople from Bojnice
Slovak footballers
Association football forwards
FC Baník Prievidza players
AS Trenčín players
AFC Nové Mesto nad Váhom players
FK Slovan Nemšová players
FK Pohronie players
FK Dukla Banská Bystrica players
FC Rohožník players
Slovak Super Liga players
3. Liga (Slovakia) players
2. Liga (Slovakia) players